The Directorate General of Civil Aviation (DGCA) is a statutory body of the Government of India to regulate civil aviation in India. It became a statutory body under the Aircraft (Amendment) Act, 2020. The DGCA investigates aviation accidents and incidents, maintains all regulations related to aviation and is responsible for issuance of licenses pertaining to aviation like PPL's, SPL's and CPL's in India. It is headquartered along Sri Aurobindo Marg, opposite Safdarjung Airport, in New Delhi.
The Government of India is planning to replace the organisation with a Civil Aviation Authority (CAA), modelled on the lines of the American Federal Aviation Administration (FAA).

Vision 
Endeavour to promote safe and efficient Air Transportation through regulation and proactive safety oversight system.

Functions

Registration of civil aircraft
Certification of airports
Licensing to pilots, aircraft maintenance engineers, air traffic controllers and flight engineers, and conducting examinations and checks for that purpose
Carrying out amendments to the Aircraft Act, the Aircraft Rules and the Civil Aviation Requirements for complying with the amendments to ICAO Annexes, and initiating proposals for amendment to any other Act or for passing a new Act in order to give effect to an international Convention or amendment to an existing convention.
Formulation of standards of airworthiness for civil aircraft registered in India and grant of certificates of airworthiness to such aircraft
Conducting investigation into incidents and serious incidents involving aircraft up to 2250 kg AUW and taking accident prevention measures, including formulation of implementation of Safety Aviation Management Programmes
Checks on the proficiency of flight crew and other operational personnel such as flight dispatchers and cabin crew
Coordination of ICAO matters with all agencies, sending replies to State letters, and taking all necessary action arising out of the Universal Safety Oversight Audit Programme (USOAP) of ICAO.
Granting Air Operator's Certificates to Indian carriers and regulation of air transport services operating to/from/within/over India by Indian and foreign operators, including clearance of scheduled and non-scheduled flights of such operators
Approval of institutes engaged in flying training including simulator training, AME training, air traffic services training or any other training related with aviation, with a view to ensuring a high quality of training
Approval to aircraft maintenance, repair, design and manufacturing organizations and their continued oversight
A nodal agency for implementing Annex 9 provisions in India and for coordinating matters relating to facilitation at Indian airports, including holding meetings of the National Facilitation Committee DGCA Organisation Manual
Rendering advice to the Government on matters relating to air transport including bilateral air services agreements, on ICAO matters and generally on all technical matters relating to civil aviation, and to act as an overall regulatory and developmental body for civil aviation in the country
Keeping a check on aircraft noise and engine emissions in accordance with ICAO Annex 16 and collaborating with the environmental authorities in this matter, if required
Regulation and oversight of matters related to Air Navigation Services. Coordination at national level for flexi-use of air space by civil and military air traffic agencies and interaction with ICAO for provision of more air routes for civil use through Indian airspace
Promoting indigenous design and manufacture of aircraft and aircraft components by acting as a catalytic agent
Approving training programmes of operators for carriage of dangerous goods, issuing authorizations for carriage of dangerous goods, etc.
Safety Oversight of all entities approved/ certified/ licensed under the Aircraft Rules 1937.

Departments 
These are classified and divided into the following:
 Administration Directorate
 Aerodrome Standards Directorate (AD)
 Air Safety Directorate (DAS)
 Air Transport Directorate (AT)
 Airworthiness Directorate (DAW) (which is also responsible for registering drones in India)
 Flight Standards Directorate (FSD)
 Information & Regulation Directorate (DRI)
 Aircraft Engineering Directorate (AED)
 Directorate Of Flying Training (DFT)
 Medical Section
 Directorate of Training & Licensing (DTL)
 Directorate of Airspace and Air Navigation Services Standards (ANSS)

Regional offices 
DGCA has fourteen Regional Airworthiness Offices (RAO) at Delhi, Mumbai, Chennai, Kolkata, Bangalore, Hyderabad, Kochi, Bhopal, Lucknow, Patna, Bhubaneshwar, Kanpur, Guwahati and Patiala. It has also five Regional Air Safety offices located at Delhi, Mumbai, Chennai, Kolkata and Hyderabad. It has a Regional Research and Development Office located at Bangalore and a Gliding Centre at Pune.

Civil Aviation Authority 
The CAA has been envisaged as an autonomous regulatory body which will replace the DGCA and will meet standards set by the UN's International Civil Aviation Organization (ICAO). The CAA will have separate departments to deal with safety, economic regulation and grievance resolution, as well as a full-fledged environment department. It will also have an independent accident investigation bureau. The Authority will also have the autonomy to recruit staff. Currently, the DGCA is understaffed and does not have any recruitment powers. 
The CAA will have administrative and financial powers similar to those of the American FAA. These powers will redefine the regulator's role and better equip it to face the challenges of the growing Aviation sector in the country. Employees working with DGCA will be transferred to the CAA.

The estimated cost of establishing the new Authority would be around Rs 11.2 million. The CAA would be self-financing and have a separate fund called the 'Civil Aviation Authority of India Fund' that would finance its entire expenses. It would have a Chairperson, a Director General and 7-9 members appointed by the Central Government. These members will be qualified in the fields of aviation safety, aircraft engineering, flight standard operations, aerodromes, air navigation systems and air space management.

Air accident investigation
Previously the DGCA conducted investigations and gave information to the investigations established by the Court of Inquiry and the Committee Inquiry. A separate investigative agency was established to comply with the Standards And Recommended Practices (SARPs) of the International Civil Aviation Organization (ICAO). Therefore, the Aircraft Accident Investigation Bureau (AAIB) was established in 2011.

Aviation security
In January 1978, the Bureau of Civil Aviation Security (BCAS) was established as a department of the DGCA. As a result of the 1985 bombing of Air India Flight 182, on 1 April 1987 the BCAS became an independent agency of the Ministry of Civil Aviation.

Aircraft projects
 Bharat Swati

FOI resignation
13 Flight Operations Inspectors working with the DGCA have tendered their resignation in a week of May 2015 in protest against the aviation regulator's decision to post them away from their homes Delhi to Mumbai and Chennai.

See also

 Airline codes
 Aviation in India
 Airport Authority of India
 International Civil Aviation Organization
 Aircraft Accident Investigation Bureau (India)

References

External links 
 Directorate General of Civil Aviation

Government agencies of India
Regulatory agencies of India
Organizations investigating aviation accidents and incidents
Ministry of Civil Aviation (India)
Government agencies established in 2020
2020 establishments in India